Douglas Barrault (born April 21, 1970) is a Canadian-born former professional ice hockey Right Winger. Drafted 155th overall in the 1990 NHL Entry Draft by the Minnesota North Stars, he played in four National Hockey League games with the North Stars and Florida Panthers. He was claimed by the Panthers in the Expansion draft for their inaugural season on June 24, 1993.

Career statistics

Regular season and playoffs

International

Awards and honours

References

External links

1970 births
Atlanta Knights players
Brandon Wheat Kings players
Canadian ice hockey right wingers
Chicago Wolves (IHL) players
Cincinnati Cyclones (IHL) players
Florida Panthers players
Ice hockey people from British Columbia
Kalamazoo Wings (1974–2000) players
Lethbridge Hurricanes players
Living people
Minnesota North Stars draft picks
Minnesota North Stars players
Seattle Thunderbirds players
People from the Columbia-Shuswap Regional District